Robert Alexander Warke (10 July 1930 – 12 January 2021) was Bishop of Cork, Cloyne and Ross from 1988 to 1998.

He was educated at The King's Hospital and Trinity College Dublin, and ordained deacon in 1953 and priest in 1954. His first post was a curacy at  St Mark’s Newtownards. He was later Rector of Dunlavin, then at the parish of Drumcondra and North Strand, Rector of Zion Church Rathgar, and finally (before his elevation to the episcopate) in 1980 Archdeacon of Dublin.

Notes

Archdeacons of Dublin
20th-century Anglican bishops in Ireland
Bishops of Cork, Cloyne and Ross
1930 births
2021 deaths
People educated at The King's Hospital
Alumni of Trinity College Dublin